Walter Hawkins (1949–2010) was an American gospel music singer and pastor.

Walter Hawkins may refer to:
 Walter Hawkins (ship broker) (1787–1862), British ship and insurance broker, antiquarian and numismatist
 Walter Foxcroft Hawkins (1863–1922), American attorney and mayor of Pittsfield, Massachusetts
 Walter Lincoln Hawkins (1911–1992), American chemist
 Walter Everette Hawkins, African American poet